William Armstrong  (1804-????) was a Newcastle upon Tyne concert hall songwriter and performer of the 19th century. His most famous song is probably The Newcassel Worthies.

William's life 
William Armstrong was born c1804 in Painter Heugh (or Hugh), (which was an old lane dating from medieval Newcastle, a lane joining lower part of Dean Street to the higher part of Pilgrim Street), the name possibly derived from the fact that ships tied up here in the tidal parts of the Lort Burn (now filled).
His father was a shoemaker owning a business in Dean Street.
William himself was apprenticed to a Mr Wardle, a painter of White Cross (the site of a previous market cross dating from 400–500 years previous) in Newgate Street.
After his apprenticeship he worked as a journeyman. (It is not known whether he actual achieved the degree of "master" in his trade).
He was admired as the singer "Willie Armstrong"  as well as being appreciated as a songwriter, and was known as a performer who enjoyed singing his own songs.

He moved to London c1833-34 after which, very little is known of him or his life.

Works 
Many of his songs were of the times, of the Colliers and the Keelboatmen, or humorous occurrences.

Taken as a whole, the collection of songs become a social history of the times as well as a feast of dialect materials

Some of the publications containing his works are :--
 His earliest known song The Jenny Howlet (or Lizzie Mudie's Ghost) was first published in one of John Marshall's Chap-Books in 1823
 A Collection of Songs, Comic, Satirical, and Descriptive, chiefly in the Newcastle Dialect, and illustrative of the language and manners of the common people on the Banks of the Tyne and neighbourhood. By T. Thompson, J. Shields, W. Mitford, H Robson, and others. Newcastle upon Tyne: Printed by John Marshall in the Old Flesh-Market. 1827
 The Tyne Songster, Fordyce's 1842 Newcastle Song Book, produced by W & T Fordyce in 1840 included more of his works.
 Songs of the Tyne; being a collection of popular local songs. No.4 including Newcastle Worthies by William Armstrong - published by  J. Ross, Royal Arcade, Newcastle upon Tyne c1846

The following is a list of just some of his songs :-

 Invitation to the Mansion-house Dinner in honour of the Coronation
 Keelmen and the Grindstone
 The Jenny Howlet or Lizzie Mudie's Ghost
 Newcastle Worthies
 The Golden Horns, or the General invitation

See also
Geordie dialect words
John Ross
The Songs of the Tyne by Ross
W & T Fordyce
The Tyne Songster
John Marshall
Marshall's Collection of Songs, Comic, Satirical 1827

References

External links
 Tyneside music Willie Armstrong
 Songs of the Tyne by Ross
 The Tyne Songster by W & T Fordyce
 Marshall's Collection of Songs, Comic, Satirical 1827

English singers
English songwriters
People from Newcastle upon Tyne (district)
Musicians from Tyne and Wear
1804 births
Geordie songwriters
Year of death missing